Killzone is a first-person shooter, developed by Guerrilla Games and released on 2 November 2004 in North America and 26 November 2004 in Europe. The game was remastered in HD by Supermassive Games and re-released within the Killzone Trilogy for PlayStation 3 as well as a standalone PSN title in 2012.

Killzone takes place in the middle of the 24th century and chronicles the war between two human factions; the Vektans, and the Helghast. The game is played from a first-person view and follows Jan Templar, a high-ranking officer within the Interplanetary Strategic Alliance, as he battles invading Helghast forces on his homeworld of Vekta.

Prior to its release Killzone was heavily anticipated with several publications considering it to be Sony's "Halo killer" title. Upon release, however, the game was met with mixed responses, with critics praising the visuals, sound, and music, but criticizing the gameplay, AI, and technical issues. Despite mixed reactions, Killzone spawned numerous sequels, beginning with a direct sequel, Killzone 2.

Plot
Killzone takes place in a fictional world set in the year 2357. After nuclear war rendered much of the Earth uninhabitable in 2055, world governments formed an international order known as the United Colonial Nations. Partnering with private firms, the UCN moved to establish human colonies in Alpha Centauri, a system occupied by two planets: Vekta, a rich Earth-like world (named after the CEO of the mining conglomerate Helghan, Philip Vekta), and Helghan, a barren wasteland named after the same company. The Helghan Corporation sought to buy ownership of Vekta as well, but when the UCN imposed sanctions against its unfair business practices, a war broke out (known as the First Extrasolar War), which led to the ISA, the military arm of the UCN, driving the company out of Vekta. In response, the exiled colonists established their own civilization on Helghan, built on the principles of militarism and authoritarianism. The harsh environment and atmosphere killed many Helghans, forcing the survivors to use respirators and air tanks just to breathe. Eventually, the population, now known as the Helghast, mutated into pale-skinned hairless humanoids with increased strength, stamina, and intelligence. Violently xenophobic and convinced of their superiority, the Helghan consider humans to be beneath them, and dream of one day reconquering Vekta and expanding their empire to Earth and the neighboring star systems.

Story
Scolar Visari, emperor of Helghan, sends the Helghast Third Army to launch a secret invasion of Vekta. Alerted to the attack, the ISA attempt to prevent it with their SD (Solar Defense) network, but are unable to activate it in time to stop the invaders. With the element of surprise on their side, the Helghast quickly overwhelm the unprepared ISA ground forces and capture several strategic locations, including ISA Central Command.

While taking part in an offensive to slow the Helghast assault, Captain Jan Templar, a veteran ISA officer, is summoned to a meeting by his mentor and close friend, General Bradley Vaughton. Vaughton discloses that the ISA has requested assistance from the UCN and are working to restore the defense network. He also reveals that Colonel Gregor Hakha, a half-Helghan intelligence officer, had, on his orders, infiltrated the inner circle of Third Army commander General Joseph Lente, only to vanish while traveling to an extraction point in Vekta's slums. As Hakha is the only individual with knowledge of how the invasion bypassed SD, he assigns Jan to locate him. After fighting his way through the Helghast occupying the exterior of Central Command, Jan runs into Luger, a former comrade who is now working with an elite ISA division known as the Shadow Marshals. He also recruits the services of Ricardo Velasquez, an ISA gunner seeking revenge for the massacre of his entire platoon.

After rescuing Hakha, the team discovers that General Stuart Adams, the overseer for SD, is secretly working for Lente. He murders Vaughton and takes control of the system, planning to use it to destroy the relief fleet headed to Vekta. Under Jan's leadership, the team destroys several Helghast bases and infrastructure projects, eventually intercepting and killing Lente when he tries to deal with them personally. Adams retreats to the SD control center and tries to reason with the group, explaining that the Helghast will stop at nothing to reclaim Vekta, regardless of how many lives they lose. Nevertheless, the team disables the station and escapes just as the fleet destroys it, killing Adams. Jan and Luger speculate about what the future holds, realizing that the real war is far from over.

Voice cast
 Kal Weber as Captain Jan Templar
 Taylor Lawrence as Shadow Marshal Luger (credit as Jennifer Lawrence)
 Tom Clarke Hill as Sgt. Rico Valasquez
 Sean Pertwee as Colonel Gregor Hakha
 Brian Cox as Scolar Visari
 Steven Berkoff as General Joseph Lente
 Ronny Cox as General Stuart Adams
 Bob Sherman as General Bradley Vaughton
 John Schwab as Additional ISA Voices
 Kenny Andrews as Additional ISA Voices (credit as Kennie Andrews)
 Kerry Shale as Additional ISA Voices
 Eric Meyers as Additional ISA Voices (credit as Eric Myers)
 Larissa Murray as Additional ISA Voices
 Jonathan Keeble as Additional Helghast Voices
 Gary Martin as Additional Helghast Voices

Reception

Killzone received "mixed or average" reviews according to the review aggregation website Metacritic. Reviewers cited technical problems with Killzone, including inconsistent AI, occasional bugs, frame-rate issues, distracting graphical glitches, repetition of the same voices, short draw distance, and an awkward control system. Critics also complained about the gameplay, with IGN labeling it "underwhelming and mediocre".

Reviewers such as GameSpy claimed that Killzone partly suffered due to the incredible publicity it received before release, raising expectations only for them to go unfulfilled. Despite this, Killzone was admired for its sound effects, its soundtrack, and its presentation of a gritty war zone; it was also credited for its unique hard sci-fi art design. In Japan, where the game was ported and published by Sega on October 27, 2005, Famitsu gave it a score of one seven, one nine, one eight, and one seven for a total of 31 out of 40.

The game shipped close to 2 million units worldwide by December 2005.

References

External links

  (Killzone Command Center)
  
 Killzone at PlayStation.com (North America)
 

2004 video games
Alpha Centauri in fiction
First-person shooters
Killzone games
PlayStation 2 games
PlayStation 3 games
Sony Interactive Entertainment games
Video games developed in the Netherlands
Video games featuring female protagonists
Video games scored by Joris de Man
Video games set on fictional planets